Henrik Anders Norlander (born 25 March 1987) is a Swedish professional golfer, who plays on the PGA Tour.

Early life
Norlander was born and grew up in Danderyd, outside Stockholm, Sweden, and is son of lawyer Anders Norlander. He played both tennis and golf in his youth, but finally preferred golf. His competitive career began at Fågelbro Golf & Country Club, but he later came to represent Djursholm Golf Club.

In 2002, Norlander finished second to David Lingmerth, who also came to be a PGA Tour player, at his age level category (15) at the unofficial Swedish Youth Championship, Bankboken Cup, at Falun-Borlänge Golf Club. The year after, he won the 16-years-old category.

Amateur career
Norlander was part of the Swedish teams at the European Boys' Team Championship once and the European Amateur Team Championship three times. He also represented Sweden at the Eisenhower Trophy in 2008 in Adelaide, Australia, earning a bronze medal, and 2010 in Buenos Aires, Argentina.

He played college golf in the United States at Augusta State University in Augusta, Georgia. He helped lead his team to the 2010 NCAA Division I Championship. After graduating in June 2011, he turned professional.

Norlander's best ranking on the World Amateur Golf Ranking was 10th.

Professional career
Norlander played on the Challenge Tour in 2011, making three cuts in eight events with a best finish of T-19 at the Norwegian Challenge.

By finishing T-22 at the 2012 PGA Tour Qualifying School, he earned his PGA Tour card for 2013. On the PGA Tour in 2013, Norlander made 13 cuts in 22 events with a best finish of T-15 at the Zurich Classic of New Orleans.

Norlander played the Web.com Tour in 2014 and 2015, winning his first professional tournament at the 2015 Hotel Fitness Championship. He finished third in the 2015 Web.com Finals (excluding regular season top 25), to earn a place on the 2016 PGA Tour, where his best finish was a tie for 25th at the Travelers Championship. He had a chance to keep his PGA Tour card at the Web.com Tour Finals, but when Hurricane Matthew got the Tour Championship cancelled, he was $788 short.

Norlander was competing on a sponsor's exemption when he found himself in a five-man playoff at the RSM Classic in November 2016. Darkness fell on Sunday after two playoff holes and when play resumed Monday morning he lost to rookie Mackenzie Hughes of Canada, who holed an 18-footer from off the green.

He won the 2019 Wichita Open on the Korn Ferry Tour, after a five-man playoff, and finished the season 11th on the 2019 tour standings, to qualify to the 2020 PGA Tour.

He finished tied 5th at the 2019 (2019–2020 season) RSM Classic, his second career top-five on the PGA Tour, both coming at this same event. After five made cuts in a row in June and July 2020, including a tied 6th place at the 2020 Memorial Tournament, Norlander advanced to 57th on the FedEx Cup ranking, for a sure spot in the 2020 FedEx Cup Playoffs. At the same time,  he reached a career best 141st on the Official World Golf Ranking.

By finishing tied second at the Farmers Insurance Open at Torrey Pines, San Diego, California, 31 January 2021, Norlander matched his best finish on the PGA Tour. After finishing in the top-30 four weeks in a row on the 2021 PGA Tour, Norlander advanced to a career best 96th on the Official World Golf Ranking on 14 February 2021.

Private life
Norlander is married to Julie Anderson, a native of Augusta, Georgia, where the couple resides. Norlander is a member of Augusta Country Club.

Amateur wins
2009 Chrysantemumbålen (Stockholm Golf Club, Sweden)
2010 Administaff ASU Invitational
2011 General Hackler Championship

Source:

Professional wins (2)

Korn Ferry Tour wins (2)

Korn Ferry Tour playoff record (1–0)

Playoff record
PGA Tour playoff record (0–1)

Results in major championships

CUT = missed the halfway cut

Results in The Players Championship

CUT = missed the halfway cut

Team appearances
Amateur
European Boys' Team Championship (representing Sweden): 2004
European Amateur Team Championship (representing Sweden): 2008, 2009, 2010
Eisenhower Trophy (representing Sweden): 2008, 2010
Palmer Cup (representing Europe): 2009 (winners), 2010, 2011

See also
2012 PGA Tour Qualifying School graduates
2015 Web.com Tour Finals graduates
2019 Korn Ferry Tour Finals graduates
2022 Korn Ferry Tour Finals graduates

References

External links

Swedish male golfers
European Tour golfers
PGA Tour golfers
Olympic golfers of Sweden
Golfers at the 2020 Summer Olympics
Augusta Jaguars men's golfers
Korn Ferry Tour graduates
Sportspeople from Stockholm County
People from Danderyd Municipality
1987 births
Living people